Brian Francis Wynne Garfield (January 26, 1939 – December 29, 2018) was an Edgar Award-winning American novelist, historian and screenwriter. A Pulitzer Prize finalist, he wrote his first published book at the age of eighteen. Garfield went on to author more than seventy books across a variety of genres, selling more than twenty million copies worldwide. Nineteen were made into films or TV shows. He is best known for Death Wish (1972), which launched a lucrative franchise when it was adapted into the 1974 film of the same title.

Early life
Garfield was born in New York City, the son of George Garfield and Frances O'Brien, a portrait artist and friend of Georgia O'Keeffe. O'Keefe had introduced the pair. He was the nephew of chorus dancer and stage manager Chester O'Brien, and a distant relative of Mark Twain.

Career
In the 1950s, Garfield toured with The Palisades, who released a single on the Calico label. He attended the University of Arizona and served in the U.S. Army and the Army Reserves from 1957-65.

His first novel, Range Justice, written when he was eighteen, was published in 1960. By the end of the following decade, he had published sixty novels. Once he turned fifty, Garfield continued to publish, but at a less prolific rate. 

In 1972, he published Death Wish which was adapted into the film of the same title. Four movie sequels followed, all starring Charles Bronson in the lead role. Bruce Willis starred in a 2018 remake. Garfield was directly involved only in the original movie. He wrote a sequel, Death Sentence (1975), which was very loosely adapted into the 2007 film of the same name. While the film had a different storyline, it adopted the novel's critical perspective on vigilantism. Hopscotch, also published in 1975, won the Edgar Award for Best Novel. Garfield wrote the screenplay for the 1980 film adaptation starring Walter Matthau, Glenda Jackson and Sam Waterston. 

In 1970, Garfield was a finalist for the Pulitzer Prize for History for The Thousand-Mile War: World War II in Alaska and the Aleutians. His last book, published in 2007, was a critical biography of the controversial British intelligence officer Richard Meinertzhagen.

He and his wife Bina divided their time between their homes in Pasadena, California and Santa Fe, New Mexico. They were supporters of Wildlife WayStation, an animal sanctuary in Southern California.

Death
Garfield died at home in Pasadena in December 2018 at the age of 79. His wife said the cause was complications of Parkinson's disease.

Legacy
John Grisham credited Garfield’s article “Ten Rules for Suspense Fiction” with “giving him the tools” to write his thrillers. When he died, Lawrence Block tweeted, “RIP Brian Garfield. Fine writer, friend for years”. In 2015, The Georgia O'Keeffe Museum Research Center in Sana Fe announced that Brian Garfield and his wife had given a gift of correspondence between O’Keeffe and Garfield's mother, Frances O’Brien, "that provides insight into the women’s shared work ethic, their era and their sense of humor — and shows O’Keeffe’s penchant for dashes in her informal notes. The gift includes letters, postcards, interviews and other materials from the 1940s to the 1970s that were collected by O’Brien".

Pen names
Bennett Garland
Alex Hawk
John Ives
Drew Mallory
Frank O'Brian
Jonas Ward
Brian Wynne
Frank Wynne

Works

Novels

Short stories 

Collections:
 Checkpoint Charlie (1981), collection of 12 short stories
 Suspended Sentences (1992), collection of 8 short stories

Non-fiction
 The Thousand-Mile War: World War II in Alaska and the Aleutians (1969)
 Western Films: A Complete Guide (1982)
 The Meinertzhagen Mystery: The Life and Legend of a Colossal Fraud (2008)

Screenplays
 The Last Hard Men (1976) - Garfield did uncredited rewrites. Based on his novel Gun Down (1971).
 Hopscotch (1980) - Based on his novel.
 The Stepfather (1987) - Screenplay by Donald E. Westlake, based on a story by Garfield, Westlake, and Carolyn Lefcourt.

See also

List of Ace Western Double Titles

References

External links

Brian Garfield author page at Piccadilly Publishing
Brian Garfield's website
Pen names

1939 births
2018 deaths
20th-century American male writers
20th-century American novelists
American male novelists
American male screenwriters
American mystery writers
Edgar Award winners
Western (genre) writers